Coxey is an unincorporated community in western Limestone County, Alabama, United States.

History
Coxey is most likely named after the first postmaster, William Cox. A post office under the name Coxey from 1918 to 1937.

References

Unincorporated communities in Alabama
Unincorporated communities in Limestone County, Alabama